The Soštarić Vrabac, ( - sparrow), was a primary glider for basic pilot training designed and built in the Kingdom of Yugoslavia in 1939.

Design and development
Of mixed composition, mostly wood and canvas, with undercarriage skis for landing, the Vrabac was designed by engineer Ivo Šoštarić in 1939, inspired by the success of the Zögling, a German primary glider. Unlike the Zögling, the Vrabac was not wire-braced, lacking a kingpost and using struts to brace the wings to the lower fuselage.
 
During tests at Vršac the Vrabac showed far better flight characteristics than not only its German exemplar, but also from the Polish Kocjan Wrona.

Production of 15 aircraft in two versions - A and B began in 1939, as the first serially built glider in Serbia. Production continued after World War II and more than 150 were made. Due to the simple design of this glider, it was also made in local aeroclubs' workshops during the winter, so that they could be used for training during the summer.

Variants
Vrabac A
Initial version
Vrabac B
second version

Aircraft on display
Aviation Museum - Belgrade - a Vrabac A, manufactured in the Utva factory at Pančevo

Specifications (Vrabac A)

See also

References

1930s Yugoslav sailplanes
High-wing aircraft